Aleksei Leonidovich Lipatnikov (born 20 July 1964) is a Russian professional football coach and a former player. He is an assistant manager of FC Dynamo Kirov.

Playing career
As a player, he made his debut in the Soviet Second League in 1988 for FC Dynamo Kirov.

References

1964 births
Living people
Soviet footballers
Russian footballers
Association football midfielders
Association football forwards
Russian football managers
FC Dynamo Kirov players